The 411 East Wisconsin Center is a high-rise located in Milwaukee, Wisconsin. It was built in 1985 on the former site of the Goldsmith Building. It was designed by Chicago architect, Harry Weese.  It is the fifth tallest building in Milwaukee, and it was the second tallest building in Milwaukee at the time of its completion, surpassed by the Milwaukee Center in 1988.

The building has been home to the Quarles & Brady law firm since 1986 and the von Briesen & Roper law firm since 1985.

In 2005 the building was sold by TIAA-CREF to Triple Net Properties, a real estate company based in Santa Ana, California, for $95 million. It had an assessed value of $89.2 million in 2005.

In 2014, Riverview Realty Partners, an affiliate of Stamford, Connecticut-based Five Mile Capital Partners purchased the building for $74 million and Quarles & Brady extended their lease for another 10 years. Five Mile Capital Partners plans on undergoing $17.5 Million in renovations to the building.

See also
 List of tallest buildings in Milwaukee

References

Skyscraper office buildings in Milwaukee
Office buildings completed in 1985